Pratylenchus reniformia is a plant pathogenic nematode.

References 

reniformia
Plant pathogenic nematodes